Jean-Louis Le Mouël (born in 1938 in Remungol) is a French geophysicist, physicist emeritus at the Institut de Physique du Globe de Paris (IPGP), which he chaired, and member of the French Academy of sciences since 1988.

He has published numerous articles in academic journals, in particular with Vincent Courtillot. He is a recognized specialist in geomagnetism. His work in this field earned him the John Adam Fleming Medal in 1997. He is a member of the American Geophysical Union and the Royal Astronomical Society, a former president of the Geological Society of France, and has received numerous scientific and non-scientific decorations. Officier of the Légion d'Honneur, CNRS Silver Medal in 1984, he also received the Grand Prix from the French Atomic Energy Commission in 1987 and the Petrus-Peregrinus Medal from the European Geosciences Union in 2004.

He questions the importance of human influence on global warming. He declared in 2009:

"The climate has varied greatly over the centuries and years. Is the recent warming due solely to human activity and the production of greenhouse gases? In view of the available observations, man-made global warming is only a hypothesis, which should be considered and discussed as such. Similarly, the consequences that are drawn from it should be discussed calmly".

He therefore calls for a dispassionate scientific debate. For him, it is essentially solar activity that impacts the climate, as well as the Earth's magnetism.

He has received criticism for his scepticism of global warming. In particular, the director of the Hadley Centre, a proponent of global warming, claimed that the data that had been used by Courtillot and Le Mouël in a 2007 study had been manipulated.

Chosen publications 

 1971, "Aeromagnetic Survey Of South-Western Europe Aeromagnetic Survey Of South-Western Europe", Earth and planetary science letters 12, with Eugène Le Borgne and Xavier Le Pichon
 V. Courtillot, J. Ducruix, J.l. Le Mouel, "Sur une accélération récente de la variation séculaire du champ magnétique terrestre", C.R.Acad.Sci.Paris, D287, 1095-1098 (1978)
 V. Courtillot, A. Galdeano, J.l. Le Mouel, "Propagation of an accreting plate boundary : discussion of a new aeromagnetic survey of the Republic of Djibouti", Earth Planet. Sci. Lett., 47, 144-160 (1980)
 " Le globe ", Jean-Louis Le Mouël, Xavier Le Pichon, Claude Japart, in Université de tous les savoirs, T15, Odile Jacob, 05/2002
 2007, "Are there connections between Earth's magnetic field and climate?", Earth Planet. Sci. Lett., 253, 328–339, with Vincent Courtillot

References

1938 births
French geophysicists
Members of the French Academy of Sciences
Living people